Sergeyevka is a rural locality (a selo) in Oktyabrskoye Rural Settlement, Paninsky District, Voronezh Oblast, Russia. The population was 217 as of 2010. There are 4 streets.

Geography 
Sergeyevka is located 14 km southeast of Panino (the district's administrative centre) by road. Toyda is the nearest rural locality.

References 

Rural localities in Paninsky District